Rafael da Silva Nascimento (born 21 May 1984), is a Brazilian footballer who plays for Oman Club in Oman First Division League.

Club career

Olaria
Nascimento began his professional footballing career in Brazil with his parent club Olaria Atlético Clube, based in his hometown, Rio de Janeiro. After spending a two-year spell in the youth teams of the club, he got promoted to the first team in 2001 and player there for the next 2 years.

Vasco da Gama
In 2003, Nascimento signed a long-term contract with another Rio de Janeiro-based and Brazilian top club, CR Vasco da Gama.

Bahia
In 2008, Nascimento moved on loan from Vasco da Gama on a six-month deal to Salvador, Bahia-based Esporte Clube Bahia. He scored his only goal for the club on 16 August 2008 in a Campeonato Brasileiro Série B match against Sociedade Esportiva do Gama. He helped the Bahia-based club achieve the runners-up position in the 2008 Campeonato Baiano.

Mesquita
In 2009, Nascimento moved back to Rio de Janeiro and more accurately to Mesquita where he was signed by Mesquita Futebol Clube on a short-term loan deal from Vasco da Gama. He made his debut for the club on 13 March 2009 in a 5-1 loss against Americano Futebol Clube and scored his first and only goal on 31 March 2009 in a 4-2 loss against Duque de Caxias Futebol Clube. He scored 1 goal in 6 appearances for the Mesquita-based club in the 2009 Campeonato Carioca.

ABC

Later in 2009, Nascimento moved to Natal, Rio Grande do Norte where he signed a short-term contract with Campeonato Brasileiro Série B club, ABC Futebol Clube. He made his debut for the club on 13 June 2009 in a 1-0 win over Vila Nova Futebol Clube. He made 6 appearances for the Natal-based club in the 2009 Campeonato Brasileiro Série B.

Duque de Caxias

In 2010, Nascimento moved to Duque de Caxias, Rio de Janeiro where he signed a one-year contract with Campeonato Carioca club, Duque de Caxias Futebol Clube. He made only one appearance for the club on 3 February 2010 in a 1-1 draw against Volta Redonda Futebol Clube when he came on as a substitute for Vander Sacramento Vieira at the 71st minute of the game.

Saham

Saham SC

Nascimento first moved out of Brazil in 2011 to the Middle East and more accurately to Oman where he signed a two-year contract with Oman First Division League club, Saham SC. He helped the club win the 2011-12 Oman First Division League and in promotion to the 2012–13 Oman Elite League. In the 2012–13, he again put up an eye catching performance for the Saham-based club as he helped them secure the 3rd position in the 2012–13 Oman Elite League which earned the club a spot in the 2014 GCC Champions League.

Al-Urooba

In 2013, Nascimento moved to the neighbor country to Oman, the United Arab Emirates where he signed a one-year contract with UAE First Division League club, Al-Urooba. He made his debut for the club on 7 September 2013 in a 2013–14 UAE President's Cup qualification match in a 4-0 win over Masafi Club and scored his first goal in the same competition on 28 September 2013 in a 3-1 win over Masafi Club. He made his UAE First Division League debut on 9 November 2013 in a 6-1 win over Al-Taawon C.S. Club and scored his first goal in the competition on 26 December 2013 in a 2-2 draw against Dibba Al-Hisn Sports Club.

Muscat
In 2014, Nascimento returned to Oman and more accurately to Muscat, the capital city where he signed a one-year contract with Oman First Division League club, Muscat Club. He scored 5 goals in 24 appearances in the 2014–15 Oman First Division League and helped his club win their maiden Oman First Division League title in the 2014-15 season.

Oman
On 1 September 2015, Nascimento signed a one-year contract with another Oman First Division League club, Oman Club.

Club career statistics

Honours

Club
With Bahia
Campeonato Baiano (0): Runner-up 2008

With Saham
Oman First Division League (1): 2011-12

With Muscat
Oman First Division League (1): 2014-15

References

External links
 
 Rafael da Silva Nascimento - SOCCER PUNTER
 
 Rafael da Silva Nascimento - GoalFace
 
 Rafael da Silva Nascimento - fanet.ae
 Rafael da Silva Nascimento - YouTube
 Rafael da Silva Nascimento - YouTube

1984 births
Living people
Footballers from Rio de Janeiro (city)
Brazilian footballers
Brazilian expatriate footballers
Olaria Atlético Clube players
CR Vasco da Gama players
Esporte Clube Bahia players
ABC Futebol Clube players
Duque de Caxias Futebol Clube players
Saham SC players
Muscat Club players
Oman Club players
Al Urooba Club players
UAE First Division League players
Expatriate footballers in Oman
Brazilian expatriate sportspeople in Oman
Expatriate footballers in the United Arab Emirates
Brazilian expatriate sportspeople in the United Arab Emirates
Association football midfielders